Vermetus adansonii is a species of sea snail, a marine gastropod mollusk in the family Vermetidae, the worm snails or worm shells.

References

External links
 Daudin, François Marie. (1800). Receuil de mémoires et de notes sur des espèces inédites ou peu connues de Mollusques, de vers et de zoophytes. xviii & 19-50. Fuchs & Treuttel et Wurtz. Paris
  Bosc, L. A. G. (1801). Histoire naturelle des coquilles, contenant leur description, les moeurs des animaux qui les habitent et leurs usages. Deterville, Paris. vol. 1, 343 p.; vol. 2, 330 p.; vol. 3, 292 p.; vol. 4, 280 p.; vol. 5, 255 p., 1 table, 44 plates
 Keen M. (1961). A proposed reclassification of the gastropod family Vermetidae. Bulletin of the British Museum, Natural History (Zoology), 7(3): 183-213, pls. 54-55.
 Bieler, R.; Petit, R. E. (2011). Catalogue of Recent and fossil “worm-snail” taxa of the families Vermetidae, Siliquariidae, and Turritellidae (Mollusca: Caenogastropoda). Zootaxa. 2948, 1-103

Vermetidae
Gastropods described in 1800